Mark Winey is an American biologist currently the Dean of the UC Davis College of Biological Sciences and formerly at University of Colorado.

References

Year of birth missing (living people)
Living people
University of California, Davis faculty
University of Colorado faculty
21st-century American biologists
Syracuse University alumni
University of Wisconsin–Madison alumni